Vladimir Aleksandrovich Yevseyev (22 January 1939 – 20 June 2012) was a Russian rower who had his best achievements in the coxed fours, partnering with Anatoly Luzgin, Anatoly Tkachuk, Boris Kuzmin and Vitaly Kurdchenko. In this event, they won two European titles and a silver medal at the 1966 World Rowing Championships; they finished in fifth place at the 1964 Summer Olympics.

In 1963 Yevseyev graduated from the Moscow State Aviation Technological University (MATI) with a diploma in pressure treatment of metals, and since 1964 till retirement taught at MATI. In 1973 he defended his PhDs on preparation of layered composite materials. Over the years he published 40 peer-reviewed articles and held 17 patents, five of which were applied in the industry.

References

1939 births
2012 deaths
Olympic rowers of the Soviet Union
Rowers at the 1964 Summer Olympics
Soviet male rowers
Russian male rowers
World Rowing Championships medalists for the Soviet Union
European Rowing Championships medalists